Littledale may refer to:

People
Harold Littledale (1853–1930), professor of English
Joseph Littledale (1767–1842), a British judge
Richard Frederick Littledale (1833–1890), an Anglo-Irish clergyman and writer
Ronald Littledale (1902–1944), a British Army officer and POW
St. George Littledale (1851–1931), an English explorer of Central Asia
Thomas Littledale (1850–1938), a British Olympic sailor

Places
Caton-with-Littledale, a civil parish in Lancashire, including the village of Littledale
Littledale Hall, a former country house in Lancashire

See also
Littledale's whistling rat, a species of rat